That Which That Orphan Saw is a novel by Iranian author Mohammad Reza Sarshar about the life of Mohammad, the prophet of Islam. Sarshar has attempted to describe the tumultuous and unique life of Mohammad in the novel. Muslims believe that Mohammad was the last prophet and the most complete human being. That Which That Orphan Saw has received numerous awards and has been reprinted many times in Iran. The idea for writing the novel came to Sarshar in 1980 because he believed that there were no valuable life stories about Mohammad available for teenagers. The 8th reprinting was published in May 2013.

The book was translated to English by James C. Klark.

Narrative
The first part of That Which That Orphan Saw starts with dream of Abdul-Muttalib in which he is ordered to dig the Zamzam Well. He finds the place to dig near Mecca which he about heard in his dream. The Quraysh are against digging the well and ask Abdul-Muttalib not to do this. Finally they agree to visit a priest and accept his judgement. The priest lives outside of Mecca. Some of the Quraysh head towards the place of the priest along with Abdul-Muttalib. They miss the way and come across a difficult situation so that they let Abdul-Muttalib dig the well. Abdul-Muttalib finds a treasure while digging the well. The Quraysh tribe believe that the treasure belongs to all of them and so they decide to equitably share each part of the treasure. The 8th reprinting was published in May 2013.

Another notable point in this part of the book is the importance of having sons from the viewpoint of the families; and that Abdul-Muttalib wished to have many sons in order to protect himself from the invasions. When, after years his dream comes true he decides to sacrifice one of his sons based on his covenant with God. His dearest son, Abdullah is chosen by chance to be sacrificed. When he tries to sacrifice his son they prohibit him and advise him to visit a priestess, as a neutral person, and accept her judgement.

The priestess tells them to choose the sacrifice between Abdullah and certain number of camels by chance and increase the number of the camels by ten if Abdullah is chosen firstly. "Repeat this up to the time the camels are chosen", the priestess says. Abdul-Muttalib acts on the recommendation of the priestess and finally kills 300 camels and Abdullah survives.
Abdullah marries a woman and she gives birth to a son. He moves towards Sham and becomes sick near Yathrib and passes away in Yathrib. Consequently, Mohammad is born without a father.
The promised prophet of the apocalypse is mentioned in different parts of the book.
This book published to Urdo, Arabic and Turkish. Amazon website has published it.

See also
One Woman's War: Da (Mother)
Noureddin, Son of Iran
Fortune Told in Blood
Journey to Heading 270 Degrees
Baba Nazar (book)

References

Persian-language novels
Children's novels
Iranian biographies
2000 novels
Religious art
2000 children's books
Iranian children's literature